Bossiaea peduncularis is a species of flowering plant in the family Fabaceae and is endemic to Western Australia. It is an erect, more or less leafless shrub with arching branches, cladodes ending with a point and deep yellow, red and greenish-yellow flowers.

Description

Taxonomy and naming
Bossiaea peduncularis was first formally described in 1853 by Nikolai Turczaninow in the Bulletin de la Société impériale des naturalistes de Moscou from specimens collected by James Drummond. The specific epithet (peduncularis) means "pedunculate".

Distribution and habitat
This bossiaea is found in the Esperance Plains and Mallee biogeographic regions, where it grows on the edges of salt lakes and on hills and sand dunes.

Conservation status
Bossiaea peduncularis is classified as "not threatened" by the Government of Western Australia Department of Parks and Wildlife.

References

peduncularis
Flora of Western Australia
Taxa named by Nikolai Turczaninow
Plants described in 1853